Serupepeli Naqase (1945 – 24 January 2006) was a Fijian lawyer.  He was employed by the Native Lands Trust Board from 1974 to 2001, when he became a private legal practitioner. He unsuccessfully contested the Tailevu North Fijian Communal Constituency as an independent candidate in the parliamentary election of September 2001.

Naqase, a native of Nayavu in the Wainibuka district of Tailevu Province, collapsed in the Small Claims Tribunal courtroom in Suva on 24 January 2006, and was pronounced dead on his arrival at the local hospital, according to his obituary in the Fiji Times.

1945 births
2006 deaths
People from Tailevu Province
20th-century Fijian lawyers
21st-century Fijian lawyers